Chiara is a word and place name of Italian origin, meaning "bright" or "clear", and may refer to:

People 
 Chiara (name)
 Chiara da Montefalco, (1268–1308), an Augustinian nun and abbess
 Chiara (Italian singer) or Chiara Galiazzo (born 1986)
 Chiara or Chiara Iezzi (born 1973), Italian actress, singer, and musician known as Chiara. Also part of the duo Paola & Chiara 
 Chiara (Maltese singer) or Chiara Siracusa (born 1976)

Places
 Chiara District, Andahuaylas, Peru
 Chiara District, Huamanga, Peru

Other uses
 4398 Chiara, a minor planet
 Chiara River, a tributary of the Dârjov in Romania
 Chiara (film), 2022 film
 A song by Andrea Bocelli from the 2001 album Cieli di Toscana
 A song by the jazz group Trio 3 from the 2014 album Wiring

See also 
 Chiara e Serafina, an opera semiseria by Gaetano Donizetti
 Chiaramonte
 Ciara (disambiguation)
 Keira (disambiguation)
 Paola e Chiara, an Italian pop music duo
 Saint Clare (disambiguation)
 Santa Chiara (disambiguation)